Mount Jacques-Cartier is a mountain in the Chic-Choc Mountains range in eastern Quebec, Canada. At , it is the tallest mountain in southern Quebec, and the highest mountain in the Canadian Appalachians.

Located in the Gaspé Peninsula, the mountain is protected within a Quebec provincial park called Gaspésie National Park, and is host to the last remaining population of woodland caribou south of the Saint Lawrence River. The summit can be accessed by a hiking trail.

References

Mont Jacques
One-thousanders of Quebec
Notre Dame Mountains